"Wonderful" is the fourth single by Marques Houston's third studio album, Veteran.  It's the sixth track on the album.  It was premiered on BET's Access Granted and Yahoo! Music on July 18, 2007. It peaked at #46 on the Billboard Hot R&B/Hip Hop Songs. The song was written by Ne-Yo and produced by Stereotypes.

2007 singles
Marques Houston songs
Songs written by Micayle McKinney
Songs written by Ne-Yo
2007 songs
The Ultimate Group singles
Song recordings produced by the Stereotypes
Songs written by Jonathan Yip
Songs written by Jeremy Reeves